Beresford is a settlement in British Columbia, Canada.

Settlements in British Columbia